SV Colleges is a group of educational institutions located at Tirupati and Kadapa in Andhra Pradesh, India.

The different institutions comprising the group are: 

Universities and colleges in Tirupati
1981 establishments in Andhra Pradesh
Colleges in Andhra Pradesh
Universities and colleges in Kadapa district
Kadapa
Educational institutions established in 1981